Fiordichthys is a genus of viviparous brotula native to the southwest Pacific Ocean.

Species
There are currently two recognized species in this genus:
 Fiordichthys paxtoni (J. G. Nielsen & Cohen, 1986) (Baldhead cusk)
 Fiordichthys slartibartfasti Paulin, 1995

References

Bythitidae